The UK Rock & Metal Singles Chart is a record chart which ranks the best-selling rock and heavy metal songs in the United Kingdom. Compiled and published by the Official Charts Company, the data is based on each track's weekly physical sales, digital downloads and streams. In 2009, there were 18 singles that topped the 52 published charts. The first number-one single of the year was "Hand of Blood" by Welsh metalcore band Bullet for My Valentine, the lead single from the EP of the same name. The final number one of the year was "Killing in the Name" by American rap metal band Rage Against the Machine, which was the UK Singles Chart Christmas number one.

The most successful song on the UK Rock & Metal Singles Chart in 2009 was "New Divide" by American alternative rock band Linkin Park, which spent 13 consecutive weeks at number one. Muse spent seven weeks at number one in 2009, with "Undisclosed Desires" (four weeks), "Feeling Good" (two weeks) and "Supermassive Black Hole" (one week) all topping the chart. Bon Jovi's "Livin' on a Prayer" was number one for six weeks, Nickelback were number one for five weeks with "Gotta Be Somebody", "If Today Was Your Last Day" (two weeks each) and "I'd Come for You" (one week), and "Mercury Summer" by Fightstar and "Ignorance" by Paramore were number one for four weeks each. Biffy Clyro's "The Captain" was number one for three weeks, while songs by Kid Rock, Goo Goo Dolls and Lostprophets spent two weeks each atop the chart.

Chart history

See also
2009 in British music
List of UK Rock & Metal Albums Chart number ones of 2009

References

External links
Official UK Rock & Metal Singles Chart Top 40 at the Official Charts Company
The Official UK Top 40 Rock Singles at BBC Radio 1

2009 in British music
United Kingdom Rock and Metal Singles
2009